Beer in Korea may refer to:
Beer in North Korea
Beer in South Korea